Mariano Matías Martínez (born January 29, 1979 in Buenos Aires, Argentina) is an Argentine former footballer. He played as a centre forward.

Teams
  Atlanta 1999-2001
  Los Andes 2001-2002
  Platense 2002-2003
  Rangers 2003
  Almirante Brown 2003-2004
  Unión Atlético Maracaibo 2004
  Aris Salonica 2004-2005
  Unión de Santa Fe 2005
  Chacarita Juniors 2006-2007
  Almagro 2007
  Olimpo de Bahía Blanca 2007-2008
  Argentinos Juniors 2008-2009
  Arsenal de Sarandí 2009-2010
  Huracán 2010
  Aldosivi de Mar del Plata 2011
  Atlético Tucumán 2011-2012
  Deportivo Morón 2012-2015
  Club Comunicaciones 2015-2016

External links
 Profile at BDFA 
 

1979 births
Living people
Argentine footballers
Argentine expatriate footballers
Club Atlético Atlanta footballers
Club Almagro players
Club Almirante Brown footballers
UA Maracaibo players
Olimpo footballers
Club Atlético Platense footballers
Atlético Tucumán footballers
Unión de Santa Fe footballers
Rangers de Talca footballers
Chilean Primera División players
Argentine Primera División players
Expatriate footballers in Chile
Expatriate footballers in Greece
Expatriate footballers in Venezuela
Association football forwards
Club Atlético Los Andes footballers
Aris Thessaloniki F.C. players
Chacarita Juniors footballers
Argentinos Juniors footballers
Arsenal de Sarandí footballers
Club Atlético Huracán footballers
Aldosivi footballers
Deportivo Morón footballers
Club Comunicaciones footballers
Footballers from Buenos Aires